Silverdale School is a high school in Sheffield, South Yorkshire, England.

Silverdale School may also refer to:

Silverdale School, New Zealand, a primary school in Auckland, New Zealand
Silverdale Primary School, a primary school in Silverdale, Lancashire, England